The Neftchi Baku 2016–17 season is Neftchi Baku's 25th Azerbaijan Premier League season.

Season Events
Following the club's 8-0 defeat to Gabala on 10 September, Vali Gasimov was fired as manager. The following day Elkhan Abdullayev was appointed as manager until the end of the season.

Squad

Out on loan

Transfers

Summer

In:

Out:

Winter

In:

Out:

Trialists:

Friendlies

Competitions

Azerbaijan Premier League

Results summary

Results

League table

Azerbaijan Cup

UEFA Europa League

Qualifying rounds

Squad statistics

Appearances and goals

|-
|colspan="14"|Players away from Neftchi Baku on loan:

|-
|colspan="14"|Players who appeared for Neftchi Baku no longer at the club:

|}

Goal scorers

Disciplinary record

Notes

References

External links 
 Official Website 

Neftchi Baku
Neftçi PFK seasons
Azerbaijani football clubs 2016–17 season